L'Assiette au Beurre (literally The Butter Plate, and roughly translating to the English expression pork barrel) was an illustrated French weekly satirical magazine with anarchist political leanings that was chiefly produced between 1901 and 1912. It was revived as a monthly for a time and ceased production in 1936.

The magazine's caricature and editorial cartoon content was drawn from a varied cadre of illustrator-contributors of many backgrounds and disparate artistic styles. The content often focused on socialist and anarchist ideas. The first series expired on 15 October 1912. A second series was published between 1921 and 1925 on a monthly basis, eventually becoming a single supplement.

At the time of its founding near the start of the twentieth century, France was divided on crucial issues such as the extension of military service, revanchism (the call of French nationalists to avenge and reclaim from Germany the annexed territories of Alsace-Lorraine), right of association, separation of church and state, freedom of speech, and the emergence of new and radical political and social ideas in France such as revolutionary syndicalism, antimilitarism, anti-clericalism, Proletarian internationalism, feminism and the rise of labour law, which were all subjects of feature in the magazine.

L'Assiette au Beurre is a valuable iconographic testament of the Belle Époque ("Beautiful Era") period in France, characterized by optimism, peace at home and in Europe, new technology and scientific discoveries. Georges Wolinski (killed in the terrorist attack on Charlie Hebdo), indicated in 2011 that his magazine's work was the legacy of L'Assiette au Beurre.

Description
From its first appearance, L'Assiette au Beurre registered as a departure in form from other French humor publications. Each issue was made up of chiefly two- or three-color-inked cartoons and caricatures, given full- or sometimes double-page placement (instead of the more common quarter page real estate granted to such content in related French publications), with each installment containing a minimum of 16 illustrated pages. Special editions held up to 48 pages. Images were published from original drawings using a zincography, planographic printing process.

Periodically, a single artist was chosen for an issue to provide a variety of panels on a specific topic, making that issue a veritable collected album for that illustrator. Sometimes a team was employed as well. According to Kevin C. Robbins in  Roving Anarchists Flâneurs: The Visual Politics of Popular Protest via Parisian Street Art in L'Assiette au beurre (1900-1914), "For the most sardonic of multi-media exploits, Assiette staff paired artists with noted, left-wing essayists, poets, or novelists who provided suggestions for timely or provocative captions for each image submitted."

History

Founding

Samuel Sigismond Schwarz  was the magazine's founder and director. Schwarz was a Jewish immigrant to France from Hungary, becoming a French naturalized citizen.

After arriving in Paris in 1878, Schwarz became a book broker, specializing in the work of Victor Hugo through association with Paul Meurice. He later managed and was the editor of Le Frou Frou (1900-1923), another French humorist periodical that famously featured Picasso sketches, as well as Le Tutu and Le Pompon — magazines also in the humorist vein and known to have had anti-Dreyfusard leanings.<ref>{{cite journal|last1= Fontana|first1= Michèle|last2=Bernard|first2=Sarrazin |url= http://www.persee.fr/web/revues/home/prescript/article/roman_0048-8593_2000_num_30_107_914|title=Léon Bloy, Journalisme et subversion, 1874-1917|journal= Romantisme| location=Paris|year=2000 |volume= 30|issue=107| pages= 123–124|language=French}}</ref> Sigismund established a presence in 1895 at 9 rue Sainte-Anne in Paris as an editor of serial novels and later opened a retail space on behalf of Librairie Schwarz, located at 58 Rue de la Chaussée-d'Antin.

He launched the first issue of L'Assiette au Beurre on 4 April 1901, priced at 25 centimes; it did not have a specific theme, which later editions often did. The front cover illustration titled "Caisse de grève" ("Strike Fund") was by Théophile Steinlen and referred to the labour movement in the communes of Montceau-les-Mines and the involvement of Pierre Waldeck-Rousseau, among other Interior Ministers. Other illustrations appearing in the first edition include one by Adolphe Willette depicting the signing of an illustrated letter that plays on the idiomatic meaning of "L'Assiette au Beurre" – to lines one pockets.

This was followed by a Jean Veber drawing occupying two pages, and then by works by Charles Léandre, Gustave-Henri Jossot, Steinlein, Jacques Villon, Charles Huard, Hermann Vogel, Pierre-Georges Jeanniot, Henri-Gabriel Ibels, František Kupka, Auguste Roubille and finally by a Hermann-Paul drawing. Although there was little accompanying text, and no clear anarchist theme to the content, the first issue's tone is fiercely satirical and disrespectful of institutions and the affluent; a  trend that increased in later editions.

At inception, L'Assiette au Beurre contained no advertising in its body, but was circulated with a 4-page insert, showcasing Sigismund periodicals and literary productions, as well as editions of classic books, to be purchased directly or through a subscription.

Developments
Starting with the fourth issue's cover, the graphic presentation was changed to emulate that of a newspaper. Such typographical variation was quite unusual in the media of the day, though Cocorico had previously paved the way by giving their designers freedom to innovate in the manner. Issue no. 14 was the first to take up a theme, conveyed by its title: "La guerre" ("War"). It was illustrated with 14 lithographs signed by Hermann Paul.

The first special edition of the magazine, released in February 1902, sold for 1 franc and was headlined and took up the theme of "empoisonneurs patentés" ("Patented Poisoners" – referring to a cause célèbre in the France of the time that regarded the practice of tainting milk by adding filler, such as impure water, to increase profits). Júlio Tomás Leal da Câmara, a Portuguese painter and cartoonist who was famous in the Paris of the Belle Epoque, produced the cover, and the issue lambasted the industry for its tainted milk and other industrial food practices that were a fraud on the public. In December 1903, the paper starts printing a "false" cover without images, to guard against censorship, and at the same time to offer advertisements on the back cover.

One of the more unusual issues artistically and in format was no. 48, entitled "Crimes et châtiments" ("Crime and Punishment"). Published on 1 March 1902, and composed by Félix Vallotton, it consists of 23 lithographs printed only on the front and perforated to make each etching detachable, thus rendering it a true album of prints. The selling price was increased to 50 centimes. The format was never repeated, making it a unique feature in the magazine's run.

The first issues sold between 25,000 and 40,000 copies and garnered a profit. In 1902, Sigismund recorded sales approaching 250,000 copies. However, at the end of that year, the publication experienced its first failure linked to poor sales of some of its other titles but managed to recapitalize its newspaper group.In October 1903, at a time when business in general appeared to be going wrong for Sigismund, he passed management of the magazine over to a certain "de Boulay". The quality of the content held up under his stewardship, as did its sales. In August 1904, management was taken over by Charles Bracquart, followed by one E. Victor. The magazine's printing was moved to a more modern location at 62 rue de Provence – the offices of the established art magazine L’Épreuve, administered since at least 1903 by André Joncières, the heir to a large fortune. In January 1905, the management weekly was taken over by Joncières, who remained in control until October 1912. Joncières introduced advertising and derivative products (post cards, almanacs, calendars, etc.). The magazine's last address was 51 rue du Rocher. The penultimate issue (593) should never have appeared and had the ultimate theme "Les Vieilles Filles" ("Old Girls").

Between 1907 and 1912 Joncières broadened the magazine's appeal abroad by incorporating material about organizations such as the Second International, the CGT and various European socialist parties; the printing of Franco-German and Franco-English special issues, with bilingual captions; inviting outside cartoonists to contribute; and by coverage of significant socio-political events, such as the great French general strike of September 1911.

Decline of the series (1910-1912)L'Assiette au Beurre is a periodical demanding an artistic point of view, and its production cost was significant from the outset. From 1910-1911, the production values suffered due to financial troubles. Joncières subsidized the magazine with his fortune in an attempt to keep the price to 50 centimes. The last issue of the first series, no. 594, came out on 12 October 1912. The first series comprised 593 numbers, excluding special issues.

Joncières died in August 1920. Georges Anquetil revived L'Assiette au Beurre on 20 November 1921 in a monthly edition. From October 1925 to January 1927, the white Blackbird makes its literary supplement. Subsequently, editions were more scarce until 1936 where the title disappears officially, although between 1943 and 1944 some  reprisal editions were published containing content from the first series.

First series illustratorsL'Assiette au Beurre was primarily a work of illustrators; more than 9,600 discrete drawing were produced.

 Jack Abeillé
 Adaramakaro
 Andrisek
 Apa
 Aroun-al-Rachid
 Gil Baer
 Paul Balluriau
 Emmanuel Barcet
 Jacques Baseilhac
 Émile Bayard
 Bellery-Desfontaines
 René Berger
 Édouard Bernard
 Henry Bing
 Otto Bleistift  
 Paul Bour
 Henri Boutet 
 Léopold Braun
 Zyg Brunner [Zyg]
 Georges Bruyer
 Léonce Burret
 Eugène Cadel
 Camara (Tomás Leal da Câmara)
 Leonetto Cappiello
 Caran d'Ache
 André Cahard
 Charles Émile Egli
 Georges Carré
 Édouard Carrier
 Carsten Ravn
 Chanteclair (Lucien Émery)
 Jules Chéret
 A. Clément
 Eugène Courboin
 Édouard Couturier
 Jules Grandjouan
 Dedina
 Aristide Delannoy
 Maurice Delcourt
 Döes (Louis Sabattier)
 Noël Dorville
 Didier Dubucq
 Hector Dumas
 Abel Faivre

 Pierre Falké
 Maurice Feuillet
 Florane (Louis Blanchard)
 Ricardo Florès
 Jean-Louis Forain
 Léon Fourment 
 Frédéric Front
 Démétrios Galanis
 Gabriele Galantara
 Armand Gallo
 Georges Gaumet (Géo Gaumet)
 František Gellner
 Charles Genty
 Géo Dupuis
 Léon Carré 
 Henry Gerbault
 Charles Gir
 César Giris
 Gosé
 Fernand-Louis Gottlob
 Henri Goussé
 Jules Grandjouan
 Juan Gris
 Jules Grün
 Lucien Guy
 Albert Guillaume
 Guydo
 Carl Happel
 Lucien Haye
 Oswald Heidbrinck
 André Hellé
 Joseph Hémard
 Jules Hénault
 Hermann-Paul
 Eugene Higgins
 Bernhard Hoetger
 Charles Huard
 Václav Hradecký
 Henri-Gabriel Ibels
 Georges Hillaireau
 Paul Iribe 
 Charles-Boris de Jankowski
 Albert Jarach
 Pierre Georges Jeanniot

 Hippolyte Petitjean
 Gustave-Henri Jossot
 Paul Jouve
 Carl Jozsa
 Raphael Kirchner
 J. Kladoff
 Leó Kóber
 Konrad-Wagner
 František Kupka
 Chas Laborde
 Jean Émile Laboureur
 Ernest La Jeunesse
 Lami
 Raymond de La Nézière
 Fabien Launay
 Charles Léandre
 Camille Lefèvre
 Edmond Lempereur
 Georges Léonnec
 Alfred Le Petit
 Roberto Lewis
 Manuel Luque
 Louis Malteste
 Maurice Marodon
 Louis Marcoussis [Markous]
 Aris Mertzanoff
 Lucien Métivet
 Georges Meunier
 Arthur Michaël
 Tony Minartz
 Henry Mirande
 Hector Moloch
 Pierre-Louis Moreau
 Louis Morin
 Valéry Müller
 Cesare Musacchio
 Félix Nadar
 Bernard Naudin
 Nob
 Frisco Othman
 Manuel Orazi
 Georges d'Ostoya
 Pelele
 Petitjean

 Mario Pezilla
 Pierlis 
 Rudolf Plaček
 Jean Plumet
 Paul Poncet
 Poulbot
 Vojtěch Preissig
 Benjamin Rabier
 Maurice Radiguet
 Gaston Raieter
 Georges Redon
 Raymond Renefer
 Albert Robida
 Roubille 
 Sancha
 Marius Savignol 
 Sidley
 Ardengo Soffici
 M. Steydlé
 Steinlen
 Strix
 Ludvík Strimpl
 Jehan Testevuide
 Paul Thesing
 Jules Grandjouan
 Evelio Torent
 André Triou
 Miklós Vadász
 Henry Valensi
 Kees van Dongen
 Félix Vallotton
 Jean Veber
 Jean Villemot
 Jacques Villon
 André Viriez
 Vogel
 Lucien-Henri Weiluc
 Wély
 David Ossipovitch Widhopff
 Adolphe Léon Willette
 Jacques Yvel
 Zagnoli
 Édouard François Zier

Contributing writersL'Assiette au Beurre at times had contributions from prominent writers:

 Henri Bachelin
 Dominique Bonnaud
 Frères Bonneff
 Vladimir Bourtzeff (1862-1942)
 André Dahl
 Jacques Dhur

 Anatole France
 Henri Guilbeaux (James Burkley)
 Ernest La Jeunesse
 Octave Mirbeau 
 Émile Pataud
 Gaston de Pawlowski

 Jean Richepin
 Jehan Rictus
 Camille de Sainte-Croix
 André Salmon
 Laurent Tailhade

Themes
The purpose of an anarchist, satirical weekly, that considers itself transgressive, is of course to mock forms of authorities of all stripes; the targets ran the map: autocrats, the rich, the military, police, artists and writers, scientists, academicians, politicians, priests and believers, often through fierce caricatures. At least in its early stages the magazine maintained a focus on political issues through its drawings, sometimes anti-semitic (in 1902, Judaism was skewered) and often anti-freemasonry and anti-imperialism. The plutocracy was systematically attacked. L'Assiette au Beurre employed more than two hundred artists of an international character. Social issues, often taboo, were also included, such as the death penalty, trafficking of children, sexuality, or even of the themes of daily life such as "L'argent" ("money"), "Le gaz" (gas"), "La police [et ses excès]" (the police and their excesses]), "L'alcool" ("alcohol"), "Paris la nuit" ("Paris by night"), and many others.

List of theme issues
 No. 26: "Les camps de reconcentration du Transvaal" ("Concentration Camps in the South African Republic"), by Jean Veber, 1901.
 No. 30: "La prostitution" ("Prostitution"), by Kees van Dongen, 26 October 1901.
 No. 41: "L'argent" ("Money"), by Kupka, 11 January 1902.
 No. 42: "Les tueurs de la route" ("The Road Killers"), by Weiluc, 18 January 1902.
 No. 48: "Crimes et châtiments" ("Crime and Punishment")", by Félix Vallotton, 1 March 1902.
 No. 88: "Bêtes et gens" ("Man and Beast"), by Benjamin Rabier, 6 décembre 1902.
 No. 101: "Les Académisables", by Camara, 7 March 1903.
 No. 108: "Esthètes" ("Aesthetes"), by Paul Iribe, 25 avril 1903.
 No. 110: "Colonisons ! L'Algérie aux Algériens" ("Colonize! the Algeria Algerians"), by Jules Grandjouan, May 1903.
 No. 112: "La police" ("The police"), by Camara, Jules Grandjouan, Georges d'Ostoya, Léon Fourment, Lengo, 23 May 1903.
 No. 156: "Les refroidis" ("The Frozen"), by Jossot, 26 March 1904 (le conformisme social).
 No. 173: "Asiles et fous" (Asylums and the Mad"), by Aristide Delannoy, 23 July 1904.
 No. 178: "La graine" ("The Seed"), by Jossot, 27 août 1904 (sur le contrôle des naissances).
 No. 201: "Le Tzar rouge" ("The Red Tzar"), by divers dessinateurs don't Galanis, 4 février 1905 (la révolution russe de 1905).
 No. 214: "La grève" (Strike"), by Bernard Naudin et Jules Grandjouan, 6 May 1905.
 No. 263: "La liberté" ("Freedom of the Press"), by Roger Sadrin, 14 April 1906.
 No. 324: "Europa, numéro illustré international" ("Europa International Illustrated Number"), 15 June 1907.
 No. 348: "La prison de la Petite Roquette", text by Miguel Almereyda; illustrations d'Aristide Delannoy, 30 November 1907.
 No. 374: "Zola au Panthéon" ("Zola at the Pantheon"), by Georges d'Ostoya, 30 May 1908 (regarding the Dreyfus Affair).
 No. 389: "L'enfance coupable" ("Guilty Childhood"), by Bernard Naudin, 12 September 1908.
 No. 435: "Le grand soir" ("The Big Night"), text by Émile Pataud; illustrations  by André Hellé, 7 May 1910.
 No. 510: "Promenade dans Paris, le Sacré-Cœur" ("A Walk through the Sacred Heart of Paris") 7 January 1911. 
 No. 582: "Les Compensations" ("Compensation"), by Henry Valensi, 4 November 1911.

Special editions and supplements
 "Les Empoisonneurs patentés - Les falsificateurs de lait" ("Patented Poisoners - the Milk Tainters), 48 pages, 1901.
 "Le cas de M. Monis" ("The Case of Mr. Monis"), No. 7, 8 pages, 21 May 1901 by Adolphe Willette.
 "Supplément littéraire [la guerre]" ("Literary Supplement [The War]"), No. 14, 8 pages, 4 July 1901.
 "Tartines de l'Assiette au beurre" ("Bread of the Butter plate"), 6 deliveries from 19 September 1901, composed by Camille de Sainte-Croix and illustrations by Maurice Feuillet.
 "La Foire aux croutes" (Frequently Asked Crusts") by Paul Iribe and Ernest La Jeunesse, 32 pages, June 1902 (issue nos. 62 and 63).
 "Les Masques" ("The Masks"), No. 8,  17 February and 7 April 1906.
 "L'Almanach de l'Assiette au beurre" ("The Butter Plate Almanac"), December 1906.
 "Madame la Baronne et sa famille, l'arbre généalogique" ("Madame la Baronne, her Family and Family Tree") by Maurice Radiguet, 1909.
 "Une page d'Espagne (L'assassinat de Ferrer)" ("A page from Spain (The assassination of Ferrer"), 1909.
 "Le Grand Paon" ("The Great Peacock") by Maurice Radiguet and Galanis, 1910.

Readership and impact
The per issue price was relatively average for a weekly of its quality at the start: 25 centimes (on average 4 times the price of a non-illustrated daily), though the price would increase to up to 60 centimes depending on the number of pages. The price base was revised upward in May 1901 (30 cents per regular issue) and in 1905 again to 50 centimes, after Sigismund withdrew. The price iwas judged too high by some, including Jules Grandjouan, who ultimately wrote to Joncières about the issue.

In February 1906, Senator René Bérenger, nicknamed " Père la Pudeur" ("Father Modesty") championed a bill focused on child prostitution: under this pretext, he sought to censor what was deemed pornographic and obscene. With its legality uncertain, the in April 1908 the Chambre des députés (Chamber of Deputies), placed the sale of L'Assiette au Beurre'' under threat of police sanction. A sales ban was instituted in railway stations (to "protéger les yeux chastes de certains publics" ("protect the chaste eyes of the public"), while some of its composers were even arrested (e.g. Jules Grandjouan) and spent a few days in prison.

Footnotes

References

External links

1901 establishments in France
1936 disestablishments in France
Defunct political magazines published in France
Anarchist periodicals published in France
French-language magazines
Monthly magazines published in France
Weekly magazines published in France
Magazines established in 1901
Magazines disestablished in 1936
Magazines published in Paris
Belle Époque